Quintet in E-flat for Piano and Winds, Op. 16, was written by Ludwig van Beethoven in 1796.

The quintet is scored for piano, oboe, clarinet, horn, and bassoon.  It is alleged to be inspired by Mozart's Quintet, K. 452 (1784), which has the same scoring and is also in E-flat.

Structure

It is in three movements:

I. Grave - Allegro ma non troppo
II. Andante cantabile 
III. Rondo: Allegro ma non troppo

The performance takes around 23–27 minutes.

Transcriptions

Beethoven subsequently transcribed the Op. 16 quintet as a quartet for piano and string trio (violin, viola, and cello), using the same opus number, tempo markings, and overall timing.

Artaria published an unauthorized transcription of the Op. 16 quintet as a string quartet which they designated as the composer's Op. 75.

References 
Notes

Sources

External links 
 
 Performance of Quintet for Piano and Winds by the Musicians from Marlboro from the Isabella Stewart Gardner Museum in MP3 format

Chamber music by Ludwig van Beethoven
Beethoven
1796 compositions
Compositions in E-flat major